The 2019 Indian general election were held on 12 May 2019. Along with all other states, results in Delhi were declared on 23 May 2019 to constitute the 17th Lok Sabha.

Candidates 
Major election candidates are:

Results

Party wise

Constituency wise

Assembly segments wise lead of Parties

References 

2019 Indian general election
Delhi
Indian general elections in Delhi
2010s in Delhi